Krasny Yakor is a rural locality (a village) in Posyolok Mezinovsky, Gus-Khrustalny District, Vladimir Oblast, Russia. The population was 38 as of 2010. There are 7 streets.

Geography 
Krasny Yakor is located 6 km south of Gus-Khrustalny (the district's administrative centre) by road. Gus-Khrustalny is the nearest rural locality.

References 

Rural localities in Gus-Khrustalny District